Rafig Huseynov (born 16 May 1988 in Tashkent) is an Azerbaijani Greco-Roman wrestler. He defeated Hungarian Péter Bácsi for the gold medal in his respective division at the 2011 European Wrestling Championships in Dortmund, Germany.

He won one of the bronze medals in his event at the 2020 Summer Olympics in Tokyo, Japan.

In 2021, Rafig became the world champion; and in 2022 he was a three-time European champion. He competed in the 82kg event at the 2022 World Wrestling Championships held in Belgrade, Serbia.

References

External links
 

Living people
1988 births
Sportspeople from Baku
European Games silver medalists for Azerbaijan
European Games medalists in wrestling
Wrestlers at the 2015 European Games
Azerbaijani male sport wrestlers
World Wrestling Championships medalists
World Wrestling Champions
European Wrestling Championships medalists
Islamic Solidarity Games medalists in wrestling
Wrestlers at the 2020 Summer Olympics
Medalists at the 2020 Summer Olympics
Olympic medalists in wrestling
Olympic bronze medalists for Azerbaijan
European Wrestling Champions
Olympic wrestlers of Azerbaijan
20th-century Azerbaijani people
21st-century Azerbaijani people